The 2018 presidential campaign of João Amoêdo was announced on 16 November 2017. On 4 August 2018, João Amoêdo became the official nominee of his party during their convention. The running mate decision had already been taken before the convention; teacher and political scientist Christian Lohbauer was chosen to compose the ticket with Amoêdo. Before running for president, Amoêdo was president of NOVO.

Platform 
Amoêdo is running as a classical liberal. He proposed the privatization of all public services of the country, and supports a simplification of the tax code.

Amoêdo also came out in favor reducing the number of senators and federal deputies, ending compulsory voting and the free political advertising time. He promised to keep Bolsa Família and to make it better. He is also in favor of making 65 years the age of retirement.

Presidential ticket

Election result

Presidential elections

References

2018 Brazilian general election
2018 Brazilian presidential campaigns